Yuri Lemeshev (born 1954 or 1955) is an American accordion player and former member of gypsy punk band Gogol Bordello.

Biography
Lemeshev was born on the island of Sakhalin, RSFSR, Soviet Union.  In 1989 he emigrated to the United States. He became popular in the East Village of New York City for his performances in bistros, wearing various hats and wigs. He has shared the stage and recorded with Nicole Renaud, Greg Wall, Mary Wooten, and Matt Darriau, and worked in a trio called Tridruga with bassist Tony Scherr and guitarist Brad Shepik. In 2001, he joined Gogol Bordello, leaving the band in 2013.

He started a duo with theremin player Pamelia Kurstin in 2007.

Discography
 Yuri Lemeshev Solo – Live at Jules (Tillotson, 1995)
 Tridruga (Love Slave, 2000)

References

External links
 

1954 births
American jazz accordionists
Gogol Bordello members
Gypsy punk
Living people
American male jazz musicians
21st-century accordionists